The Basingstoke Buffalo is an English ice hockey team from Basingstoke, Hampshire. The team plays in the NIHL 2 South West division, at the Planet Ice Silverdome. The Buffalo is the second senior team in Basingstoke behind the Basingstoke Bison which plays in the NIHL National Division.

Club roster 2020–21

2020/21 Outgoing

References

Ice hockey teams in England
Sport in Basingstoke